Allegheny General Hospital is a large urban hospital located at 320 East North Avenue in Pittsburgh, Pennsylvania. It is part of the larger Allegheny Health Network.

History 
Allegheny General Hospital, also known locally by the acronym "AGH", is located in the Central Northside neighborhood of Pittsburgh.  AGH was the first hospital in Pennsylvania to be designated as a Level 1 shock trauma center.  It was also the first hospital in the northeastern United States to offer an aeromedical service.

Now the academic flagship of Allegheny Health Network, Allegheny General Hospital began as a 50-bed infirmary, housed in two adjoining brick rowhomes in what was then Allegheny City, immediately north of Pittsburgh. Starting in 1881, the mayor of Allegheny City began meeting with a committee of physicians and prominent residents of Allegheny City, to discuss the construction of, and fund-raising for, a new North Side hospital. Three years later, the committee bought two adjacent properties along Stockton Avenue.

The hospital was chartered in 1882 and on February 15, 1886, the forerunner to today's Allegheny General Hospital opened its doors. In 1887, the hospital established a children's wing, and in 1889, an ambulance was donated to the hospital; AGH would operate its own ambulance service for the next 64 years. At the turn of the century, the hospital's directors began collecting funds for a new AGH, to be built just a block away, also along Stockton Avenue.

The seven-story, 400-bed facility cost $620,000, and opened in 1904. The new space included more modern laboratory facilities: separate rooms for urinalysis, blood work, bacteriology, and autopsies.

In the 1920, hospital leaders began looking for another new home. New York architecture firm York and Sawyer was hired to draw plans for what would be one of the nation's first “skyscraper” hospitals, and by 1929, construction was underway, just to the north of the Stockton Avenue location. The cornerstone was laid in 1930, but the Great Depression interrupted construction for several years. and the new 22-story, $8 million hospital wasn't completed until 1936.

Over the years, the hospital grew; a new East Wing was added, and in 1981, a new inpatient tower, the $104 million Snyder Pavilion, was completed.

Today, Allegheny General is a 576-bed quaternary care and educational hospital, and it is AHN's highest-volume hospital, seeing 24,000 inpatient admissions, 23,000 surgeries, and nearly 56,000 emergency department visits each year. Over the last five years, AGH has built a new orthopaedic center, a new cardiovascular intensive care unit, a new cardiac MRI center, new hybrid operating rooms, and a new surgical arts center.

In 2018, construction began on a new academic cancer center on the AGH campus.

See also
 Western Pennsylvania Hospital

References

External links

Allegheny Health Network website

Hospitals in Pittsburgh
Hospitals in Pennsylvania
Hospitals established in 1885
Pittsburgh History & Landmarks Foundation Historic Landmarks
Hospital buildings completed in 1930
Skyscrapers in Pittsburgh
Skyscrapers in Pennsylvania
Trauma centers